Gundalapadu is a village in the Phirangipuram mandalam of Guntur district, Andhra Pradesh, India. It is located approximately 35 kilometres from Guntur.

The villagers are mainly depends on cultivation and farming.  There are many business people who are running businesses successfully.

References
Villages in Guntur district